Giani Harpreet Singh (born May 1972)  is a Sikh preacher who has been serving as the Shiromani Gurdwara Prabandhak Committee-appointed acting jathedar of the Akal Takht since October 2018. He has also served as the acting jathedar of Takht Sri Damdama Sahib since April 2017.

Biography

Harpreet Singh was born in Gidderbaha in May 1972. His father was a village granthi. After completing his schooling, he graduated from Guru Kashi Gurmat Institute where he received religious education. In 1997 he joined the Shiromani Gurdwara Prabandhak Committee (SGPC) as a "pracharak" (preacher) and was appointed as head granthi of Gurdwara Darbar Sahib in Muktsar in 1999. 

He completed a one-year diploma course in divinity from Punjabi University and also completed a master's degree in religious studies from the same university. Along with Mohammad Habib he translated the Quran into the Punjabi language. In April 2017 he was appointed as the acting jathedar of Takht Sri Damdama Sahib, replacing Gurmukh Singh who was removed by the SGPC. In October 2018 he was appointed as the acting Jathedar of Akal Takht by the SGPC after the resignation of Gurbachan Singh.

Notes

References

1972 births
Living people
Jathedars of Akal Takht
Indian Sikh religious leaders